The OFC U-20 Championship 1980 was held in Fiji. It also served as qualification for the intercontinental play-off for the 1981 FIFA World Youth Championship.

Teams
The following teams entered the tournament:

 
  (host)

Group stage

Group 1

Group 2

Third place match

Final

Qualification to World Youth Championship
  (host)

Tournament winners New Zealand failed to qualify for the 1981 FIFA World Youth Championship. They did not win in an intercontinental play-off group with Argentina and Israel. Matches were played at José Amalfitani Stadium in Buenos Aires, Argentina.

External links
Results by RSSSF

1980
Under 20
1980
1980 in Fijian sport
1980 in New Zealand association football
1980 in Australian soccer
1980 in youth association football